Club Deportivo Platence  is a Salvadoran professional football club based in San Francisco Gotera, Morazan,  El Salvador.

The club currently plays in the Tercera Division de Fútbol Salvadoreño.

List of coaches
 Nelson Wilfredo Gomez Alvarenga (Temporada 2018/19)

References

Football clubs in El Salvador